La Bibliothèque oulipienne is a collection that hosts the works of the individual and collective members of the Oulipo. The short texts that compose them form a fabrique of playful literary creations.

List of Booklets 

VOLUME I (Seghers)

 1. Georges Perec: 
 2. Jacques Roubaud: 
 3. Raymond Queneau: 
 4. Collective: 
 5. Harry Mathews: 
 6. Italo Calvino: 
 7. Jacques Roubaud: 
 8. Paul Fournel: 
 9. Paul Braffort: 
 10. Paul Fournel & Jacques Roubaud: 
 11. Jacques Bens: 
 12. Noël Arnaud: 
 13. Marcel Bénabou: 
 14. Jacques Duchateau: 
 15. Jacques Roubaud: 
 16. Claude Burgelin, Paul Fournel, Béatrice de Jurquet, Harry Mathews, Georges Perec, Jacques Bens: 
 17. Jacques Duchateau: 
 18. Paul Braffort: 

VOLUME II (Seghers)

 19. Georges Perec: 
 20. Italo Calvino: 
 21. Michèle Métail: 
 22. Claude Berge: 
 23. Collective: 
 24. Jean Queval: 
 25. Marcel Bénabou: 
 26. Jacques Roubaud: 
 27. Luc Étienne: 
 28. Jacques Jouet: 
 29. Marcel Bénabou: 
 30. François Le Lionnais: 
 31. Jean Queval: 
 32. Jean Queval: 
 33. Michèle Métail: 
 34. Michèle Métail: 
 35. Michèle Métail: 
 36. Jean Lescure: 
 37. François Caradec: 

VOLUME III (Seghers)

 38. Jacques Jouet: 
 39. Michèle Métail: 
 40. Marcel Bénabou: 
 41. Jacques Roubaud: 
 42. Noël Arnaud: 
 43. Jacques Roubaud: 
 44. Jacques Jouet: 
 45. François Caradec: 
 46. Paul Fournel: 
 47. Jacques Roubaud: 
 48. Paul Braffort: 
 49. François Caradec: 
 50. Michèle Métail: 
 51. Harry Mathews: 
 52. Jacques Jouet: 

VOLUME IV (Le Castor Astral)

 53. Jacques Roubaud: 
 54. Collective: 
 55. Collective: 
 56. Jacques Jouet: 
 57. Harry Mathews: 
 58. Paul Braffort: 
 59. Marcel Bénabou: 
 60. François Caradec: 
 61. Jacques Roubaud: 
 62. Le chant d’amour grand-singe, un corpus lyrique méconnu, collected, translated and commented by Jacques Jouet

VOLUME V (Le Castor Astral)

 63. Noël Arnaud: 
 64. Jacques Jouet & Jacques Roubaud: 
 65. Collective: 
 66. Jacques Roubaud: 
 67. Claude Berge: 
 68. Collective: 
 69. Jacques Duchateau: 
 70. Harry Mathews: 
 71. Collective: 
 72. Jacques Jouet: 
 73. Oskar Pastior: 

VOLUME VI (Le Castor Astral)

 74. Hervé Le Tellier: 
 75. Michelle Grangaud: 
 76. Michelle Grangaud: 
 77. Hervé Le Tellier: 
 78. Jacques Jouet: 
 79. Collective: 
 80. Jacques Bens: 
 81. Jacques Roubaud: 
 82. Jacques Jouet: 
 83. Jacques Roubaud: 
 84. Hervé Le Tellier: 
 85. François Le Lionnais: 

Volume VII (Le Castor Astral)
 
 86. Walter Henry: 
 87. Marcel Bénabou: 
 88. Jacques Bens: 
 89. Claude Berge: 
 90. Collective: : 
 91. Georges Perec, Harry Mathews, Oskar Pastior: 
 92. Harry Mathews: 
 93. Jacques Jouet: 
 94. Hervé Le Tellier: 
 95. Michelle Grangaud: 
 96. François Caradec: 
 97. Jacques Jouet et Pierre Rosenstiehl: 
 98. Jacques Roubaud: 
 99. Paul Fournel: 

Volume VIII (Le Castor astral)

 100. Collective: 
 101. Michelle Grangaud: 
 102. Ian Monk: 
 103. Marcel Bénabou: 
 104. Jacques Bens: 
 105. Hervé Le Tellier: 
 106. Collective: 
 107. Jacques Jouet: 
 108. Jacques Jouet: 
 109. Ian Monk: 
 110.[Ian Monk]: 
 111. Harry Mathews: 
 112. Jacques Bens: 
 113. Michelle Grangaud: 

 Fascicules suivants: 

 114. François Caradec: 
 115. Michelle Grangaud: 
 116. Ian Monk: 
 117. Reine Haugure: 
 118. Harry Mathews: 
 119. Paul Braffort: 
 120. Jacques Jouet & Olivier Salon: 
 121. Collective: 
 122. François Caradec: 
 123. Collective: 
 124. Jacques Jouet: 
 125. Collective: 
 126. Oskar Pastior: 
 127. Ian Monk: 
 128. Ian Monk: 
 129. Mikhaïl Gorliouk: 
 130. Paul Braffort: 
 131. Jacques Roubaud: 
 132. Olivier Salon: 
 133. Marcel Bénabou: 
 134. Jacques Jouet: 
 135. Jacques Jouet: 
 136. Marcel Bénabou: , 2006.
 137. Collective: , 2006.
 138. Paul Fournel: , 2006.
 139. Frédéric Forte: , 2006.
 140. Paul Fournel: , 2006.
 141. Collective: , 2006.
 142. François Caradec: , 2006.
 143. Jacques Jouet: , 2006.
 144. Frédéric Forte:  2006.
 145. Collective:  2006.
 146. Jacques Roubaud & Olivier Salon: , 2006.
 147. Paul Fournel: , 2006.
 148. Collective: , 2006. 
 149. Jacques Roubaud & Olivier Salon: , 2006. 
 151. Paul Fournel: , 2006. 
 152. Jacques Roubaud & Paul Fournel: , 2006. 
 153. Marcel Bénabou: , 2006. 
 154. François Caradec: , 2006. 
 155. Jacques Roubaud: , 2006. 
 156. Jacques Bens: , 2006. 
 157. Frédéric Forte, Jacques Jouet et Jacques Roubaud: , 2007. 
 158. Jacques Roubaud: , 2007. 
 159. Anne F. Garréta: , 2007. 
 160. Anne F. Garréta & Valérie Beaudouin: , 2007. 
 161. Jacques Jouet: , 2007.
 162. Jacques Jouet: , 2007.
 163. Paul Fournel: , 2007.
 164. Jacques Jouet: , 2007.
 165. Collective: , 2007.
 166. Bernard Cerquiglini: , 2008.
 167. Frédéric Forte: , 2008.
 168. François Caradec: , 2008.
 169. Marcel Bénabou: , 2008.
 170. Olivier Salon: , 2008.
 171. Ian Monk: , à paraître en 2009.
 172. Jacques Jouet: , 2008.
 173. François Caradec et alii: , 2008.
 174. Jacques Roubaud: , 2008.
 175. Collective: , 2009.
 177. Michelle Grangaud: , 2009.
 178. Jacques Jouet: , 2009.
 179. Reine Haugure: , 2008.
 180. Daniel Levin Becker: , 2009.
 181. Ian Monk: , 2009.
 182. Marcel Bénabou: , 2010.
 183. Jacques Roubaud: , 2009.
 184. Marcel Bénabou: , 2010.
 185. Michèle Audin: , 2010.
 186. Jacques Jouet: , 2010.
 187. Frédéric Forte: , 2010.
 188. Ian Monk: , 2010.
 189. Jacques Jouet: , 2010.
 190. Hervé Le Tellier: , 2011.
 191. Michèle Audin: , 2011.
 192. Michelle Grangaud: , 2011.
 193. Paul Fournel: , 2011.
 194. Jacques Roubaud: , 2011.
 195. Collective: , 2012.
 196. Olivier Salon: , 2012.
 666. Collective:

External links 
 La Bibliothèque oulipienne chez Babelio
 Bibliothèque Oulipienne volume 7 at Le Castrol astral
 La Bibliothèque oulipienne. 2 / OULIPO on 
 La Bibliothèque Oulipienne on Cahier critique de poésie
  La Bibliothèque oulipienne (Vol.6) on Le Matricule des Anges
 Les jeudis de l'Oulipo – Pieds - 15 mai 2014 - BNF on YouTube

Experimental literature
Editorial collections